Israel Studies is a triannual peer-reviewed academic journal covering the history, politics, society, and culture of the modern state of Israel. It was established in 1996 S. Ilan Troen as founding editor(Brandeis University). It is published by the Indiana University Press. The editors-in-chief are Arieh Saposnik, Natan Aridan, and S. Ilan Troen.

Abstracting and indexing
The journal is abstracted and indexed in:
EBSCO databases
Emerging Sources Citation Index
Index Islamicus
International Bibliography of Periodical Literature
International Bibliography of the Social Sciences
Modern Language Association Database
ProQuest databases
Scopus

References

External links

Publications established in 1996
Israel studies
Middle Eastern studies journals
Indiana University Press academic journals
Triannual journals
English-language journals